List of military units raised by the state of Maine during the American Civil War.

Infantry

Cavalry
1st Maine Volunteer Cavalry Regiment
2nd Maine Volunteer Cavalry Regiment

Artillery

See also

 Lists of American Civil War Regiments by State
 Maine in the American Civil War

Notes

References
State of Maine Civil War Records Website

 
Maine
Civil War